Mathias Uwe Schulze (born 8 October 1986) is a German Paralympic athlete who competes in discus throw, javelin throw and shot put at international elite events. He is a two-time World medalist and a European champion in shot put. He was born without his left hand.

References

External links
 
 

1986 births
Living people
Sportspeople from Magdeburg
Paralympic athletes of Germany
German male discus throwers
German male javelin throwers
German male shot putters
Athletes (track and field) at the 2012 Summer Paralympics
Athletes (track and field) at the 2016 Summer Paralympics
Medalists at the World Para Athletics Championships
Medalists at the World Para Athletics European Championships